Anarestan (also Romanized as Anārestān; also known as Anāristān and Nārestān) is a village in Narestan Rural District, Aqda District, Ardakan County, Yazd Province, Iran. At the 2006 census, its population was 40, in 12 families.

References 

Populated places in Ardakan County